The Calanda is a mountain (more precisely, a massif) in the Glarus Alps with two main peaks: Haldensteiner Calanda (2805 m) and Felsberger Calanda (2697 m), both located on the border between the cantons of St. Gallen and Graubünden in eastern Switzerland. It looms over Chur, the capital city of Graubünden.

Although Felsberger Calanda's topographic prominence is 286 metres—enough to possibly be considered a mountain in its own right—the massif is commonly said to be one mountain with several peaks. It lies between the valleys of the Rhine (to the southeast) and the Tamina (to the northwest), and is separated from the Ringelspitz by the Kunkels Pass.

The name Calanda derives from the Latin "calare", roughly meaning roll down, which refers to the ever-moving southern face that can be seen at Felsberg and is still an active rock slide.

The shallow southeastern slopes lie in Graubünden, within the municipalities of Mastrils, Untervaz, Haldenstein, Felsberg and Tamins, whereas most of the steeper slopes on the northwest lie in the Canton of St. Gallen, in the municipality of Pfäfers.

Calanda's secondary peaks are called Rossfallenspitz and Güllenchopf, whereas Berger Calanda and Taminser Calanda are less prominent points that mark the ends of the main ridge.

On the northerly plateau of Felsberger Calanda, ibexes are regularly seen.

A Swiss Alpine Club mountain hut, the Calandahütte, sites on slopes below Haldensteiner Calanda, at an elevation of 2073 m.

At Felsberg, the local produced wine is called Goldene Sonne, a reminder of a gold mine in the southern face of Calanda.

References

External links
Haldensteiner Calanda on Summitpost

Mountains of the Alps
Mountains of Switzerland
Mountains of Graubünden
Mountains of the canton of St. Gallen
Graubünden–St. Gallen border
Two-thousanders of Switzerland
Tamins
Untervaz